Below is a list of ships responsible for bombarding targets at Juno Beach as part of the Normandy landings on June 6, 1944, the opening day of Operation Overlord, the Allied operation that launched the successful invasion of German-occupied western Europe during World War II.

References
 

Lists of ships of the United Kingdom
Operation Neptune
Lists of World War II ships